The 2012 Fuji GT 300km was the sixth round of the 2012 Super GT season. It took place on September 9, 2012.

Race results

References
 Race results 

Fuji GT 300km